Alma or (according to Jones 1997) /'ælmə/) is an English feminine given name, but has historically been used in the masculine form as well, sometimes in the form Almo. The origin of the name is debated; it may have been derived from "alma mater" ("benevolent mother", a title used for the Virgin Mary, and in antiquity, for several goddesses).
It gained popularity after the Battle of Alma in the 19th century and appeared as a fashionable name for girls and a popular place name, but it has decreased in appearance in the 20th and 21st centuries. The name Alma also has several meanings in a variety of languages, and is generally translated to mean that the child "feeds one's soul" or "lifts the spirit".

Origin
The exact origin of the name Alma is debated (cf. Hanks/Hodges 1990:'of uncertain origin'), but it is most likely derived (according to some sources), in the female form, from the Latin word almus, which means "kind", "fostering", or "nourishing". Drosdowski (1974) differentiates between two different names: one derived from Spanish, the other derived from Germanic names with the element 'Amal'. It has been most familiarized by its use in the term alma mater, which means "fostering mother", or "nourishing mother", and in modern times is most associated with a collegiate hymn or song, or to encompass the years in which a student earned their degree. Also, the Arabic words for "the water" and "on the water" are el-ma and al-ma, respectively. It may also be of Greek derivation, where the word αλμη means "salt water". In Hebrew, Alma means a young woman, particularly unmarried, and it appears in the Bible in the Old Testament, in the Book of Genesis 24:43.

Early appearances

It has been applied repeatedly for the title of goddesses, namely Diana and Ceres, as well as other deities of the light, earth, and day. Alma was used classically in connotation as a way to reflect the traditional female roles in providing nurture, following its derivation from its Latin root. It was introduced with minimal usage during the Italian Renaissance, as the likely result of a character by Edmund Spenser in his poem The Faerie Queene. Alma, who is the head of the House of Temperance, is considered to parallel the spirit metaphorically.

On 20 September 1854 the Battle of Alma, named after the Alma River nearby, which was a war between the French, English, and Ottoman empires and the Russian empire was fought and ended. This battle is typically considered to be the first battle of the Crimean War. Alma is the Crimean Tatar word for "apple". The name had limited use for females prior to the war, and afterwards it began appearing in birth registers for both male and female, and in significantly higher frequency. Alma also came in conjunction with many terms related to the circumstances of the war, such as "Alma Victoria", "Alma Balaklava" and "Alma Inkerman". Primarily in West England, many were christened with the name Alma. The widespread use has been attributed to the extensive news coverage of the Crimean War.

In the Book of Mormon, a collection of fifteen books first published in 1830 that is regarded as scripture by the Church of Jesus Christ of Latter-day Saints, Alma is given as the name of two characters—a father and his son. The characters are marked by a love for and service of God and appear in the Book of Mosiah and in the Book of Alma.

The name Alma also appears in Irish folklore in the masculine form: the son of Nemed was named "Alma One-Tooth", a noble prince who fought repeatedly for a respite in taxes issued by Conann on his people.

In the 1910 Census (Milan Texas Precinct 7), the name Alma appears within a family descended from Bohemia (or Czechoslovakia, depending on which other document is inspected).

Name statistics
Alma reached its highest popularity of usage in the year 1901, when it ranked No. 52 of most popular names for girls in the United States. In birth registers, this constituted .47% of the population, or roughly 1 in every 213 births. Its usage today has dropped into the thousands. It has increased in usage in recent years among parents seeking names with positive meanings for babies born during the Covid-19 pandemic. 

In numerology, the name Alma corresponds to the number 9. The characteristics of this value mean compassion, charitableness, and civility; it is regarded as being the "Humanitarian".

Meaning
The name Alma, with its Latin origin, appears in various European languages, and has different meanings in each. These varieties do not generally stray from the notion of the wise, nurturing mother, however.
ArabicKnowing, Knowledgeable, The Unbelievable but True
AramaicWorld
AzerbaijaniApple
BashkirApple (also the ancient female Bashkir name)
ChuvashApple (ulma)
Crimean TatarApple
FinnishFruit (hedelmä)
GagauzApple
GothicWorking One, Brave One
GreekLeap
HebrewMaiden, Young woman
HungarianApple
IrishApple (ull)
ItalianThe Spirit, Soul
KalmykApple (almn)
Karachay-BalkarApple
KaraimApple
KarakalpakApple
KazakhApple
KomiApple (ulmö)
KumykApple
KyrgyzApple
LatinThe Nourishing One, Kind, Life Giving, Gentle, Loving, Bounteous One and The Spiritually Supportive One
LatinApple, an arboreal fruit (mālum)
MariApple (olma)
MongolianApple (Apple in Mongolia "Alim")
NogaiApple
PortugueseThe Spirit, Soul
SpanishThe Spirit, Soul
TatarApple
TurkishApple (elma)
TurkmenApple
UdmurtApple (ulmo)
UrumApple
UyghurApple
UzbekApple (olma)

In the Hebrew Bible, Almah means maiden - a young girl or a young woman. In the Septuagint, the word is often rendered as parthenos ('virgin'), most famously in Isaiah 7:14, which is quoted in Matthew 1:23 as a prophecy about Jesus being born of the Virgin Mary.

People

Women
Alma Adams (born 1946), American politician and educator
Alma Adamkienė (born 1928), Lithuanian philologist and philanthropist
Alma Alexander (born 1965), American writer
Alma Allen (resistance member), Danish resistance member
Alma Allen (politician) (born 1939), American politician
Alma Allen (artist) (born 1970), American sculptor
Alma Åkermark (1853–1933), Swedish feminist
Alma Bella (1910–2012), Filipino actress
Alma Beltran (1919–2007), Mexican film actress
Alma Bennett (1914–1958), American film actress
Alma Birk (1917–1996), British journalist and politician
Alma W. Byrd (1924–2017), American politician
Alma Čardžić (born 1968), Bosnian singer
Alma Carroll (1924–2019), American actress
Alma Carlisle (born 1927), American architect
Alma Cogan (1932–1966), English singer
Alma Cook (Alma; born 1991), American singer
Alma Delfina (born 1960), Mexican actress
Alma Denny (1906–2003), American columnist
Alma Deutscher (born 2005), English composer and musician
Alma Dufour (born 1990), French politician
Alma Evans-Freke (1931–2017), New Zealand television personality
Alma Fahlstrøm (1863–1946), Norwegian theatre actress, director and manager
Alma Francis, American actress and singer
Alma Delia Fuentes (1937–2017), Mexican actress
Alma Galarza, Puerto Rican singer
Alma Garcia (born 1970), American writer
Alma Gluck (1884–1938), American opera singer
Alma Goatley (1887–1969), British composer
Alma Guillermoprieto (born 1949), Mexican journalist
Alma Hanlon (1890–1977), American film actress
Alma Hernandez, American politician
Alma Hinding (1882–1981), Danish film actress
Alma Hjelt (1853–1907), Finnish women's rights activist
Alma Hunt (1909–2008), American religious leader
Alma Hunt (1910–1999), Bermudian and Scottish cricketer
Alma Jeets (1896–1979), Estonian politician
Alma Jodorowsky (born 1991), French actress, model and singer
Alma Kar (1908–1992), Polish actress
Alma Karlin (1889–1950), Slovene-Austrian author
Alma Kruger (1868/1871–1960), American actress
Alma Kuula (1884–1941), Finnish singer
Alma Lee (1914–2000), Swiss-born naturalized British philatelist
Alma Mahler (1879–1964), Austrian socialite and composer
Alma Martínez (footballer) (born 1981), Mexican footballer
Alma Martinez (actress) (born 1953), American actress
Alma McClelland (1921–2000), American poker player
Alma Moodie (1898–1943), Australian violinist
Alma Moreno (born 1959), Filipina actress and politician
Alma Muriel (1951–2014), Mexican actress
Alma Murray (1854–1945), English actress
Alma Ostra-Oinas (1886–1960), Estonian journalist, writer and politician
Alma Pedersen (born 2006), Danish rhythmic gymnast
Alma Pihl (1888–1976), Finnish jeweller
Alma Powell (born 1937), American audiologist
Alma Prica (born 1962), Croatian actress
Alma Qeramixhi (born 1963), Albanian heptathlete
Alma Redlinger (1924–2017), Romanian painter
Alma Reville (1899–1982), English film director, screenwriter and editor, wife of Alfred Hitchcock
Alma Rosé (1906–1944), Austrian violinist
Alma Rubens (1897–1931), American actress
Alma Siedhoff-Buscher (1899–1944), Bauhaus trained German designer
Alma Söderhjelm (1870–1949), Swedish-Finnish historian
Alma de Bretteville Spreckels (1881–1968), American socialite and art collector
Alma G. Stallworth (1932 – 2020), American politician
Alma Sundquist (1872–1940), Swedish physician and gynaecologist
Alma Taylor (1895–1974), British actress
Alma Tell (1898–1937), American actress
Alma Thomas (1891–1978), American painter
Alma Vītola (born 1992), Latvian long-distance runner
Alma Vogt (1925–2006), Australian cricket player
Alma Wagen (1878–1967), American mountain climber
Alma Bridwell White (1862–1946), American religious leader
Alma Zack (born 1970), Israeli actress and comedienne
Alma Zadić (born 1984), Austrian politician
Alma Ziegler (1918–2005), American baseball player
Alma Zohar (born 1977), Israeli musician

Men
Alma Claude Burlton Cull (1880–1931), English painter
Alma Richards (1890–1963), American Latter-day Saint high jumper
Alma Sonne (1884–1977), American Latter-day Saint general authority
Alma O. Taylor (1882–1947), American Latter-day Saint missionary and translator

Mormon religious figures
 Alma the Younger, a prophet according to the Book of Mormon
 Alma the Elder, his father, also a prophet

Fictional characters
Alma Armas, in the video game VA-11 Hall-A
Alma Beoulve, in the video game Final Fantasy Tactics
Alma Bonnet, fictional daughter of the real life Stede and Mary Bonnet in the television series Our Flag Means Death
Alma Candela, title character of Alma and How She Got Her Name, a 2018 picture book by Juana Martinez-Neal
Alma Coin, in the novel Mockingjay
Alma Elson, in the movie Phantom Thread
Alma Dray, in the movie Now You See Me
Alma Garret, later Ellsworth, in the HBO series Deadwood
Alma Gutierrez, in the American television series The Wire
Alma Halliwell, in the soap opera Coronation Street
Alma Hodge, in the soap opera Desperate Housewives
Alma Jinnai, in the Japanese anime Jewelpet Tinkle - see List of Jewelpet Twinkle episodes
Alma Karma, an artificial human in the Japanese anime and manga series D.Gray-man
Alma Madrigal, from the 2021 Disney film Encanto
Alma Montemayor, protagonist of Porque el amor manda
Alma LeFay Peregrine, the headmistress in the Miss Peregrine's Home for Peculiar Children novel series
Alma Singer, in the novel The History of Love
Alma Wade, an antagonist from the game F.E.A.R.
Alma Walker, in the television series American Horror Story: Asylum
Alma Whittaker, in the novel The Signature of All Things
Alma Winemiller, protagonist of Tennessee Williams' play Summer and Smoke
Alma Winograd-Diaz, protagonist of the Amazon Prime series Undone.
Alma, main character in Ingmar Bergman's 1966 film Persona
Alma, a Greater Fiend from the video game Ninja Gaiden
Alma, in the television series The Handmaids Tale
Alma, the psi dragonling and soul familiar to Ritcher, in the book series “The Land”
Alma, the mother of Historia Reiss in the anime television series and manga Attack on Titan
Alma, the titular character in Alma’s Way
Alma, the mother of Kamila and the wife of Jowd in Ghost Trick: Phantom Detective

Variants

In language
AlumitEnglish, Hebrew.
AmaliaHebrew, German, Scandinavian, Czech, Hungarian, Italian
Almeta, AlmettaAfrican American.
Aerma (阿 爾 馬)Chinese.

Abbreviations for
AmeliaEnglish
AmelbergaEnglish.

References

Sources

Drosdowski, Günther. 1974. Lexikon der Vornamen. 2nd ed. Mannheim (etc.). Dudenverlag.

Hanks, Patrick and Flavia Hodges. 1990. A dictionary of first names. OUP.

Jones, Daniel. 1997. English pronouncing dictionary. 15th ed. Ed. by Peter Roach & James Hartman Cambridge : Cambridge Univ. Press

Feminine given names
English feminine given names
Estonian feminine given names
Latvian feminine given names
Spanish feminine given names
Finnish feminine given names